Michael Baur (born 16 April 1969) is an Austrian former professional footballer who played as a defensive midfielder.

Club career
Born in Innsbruck, Baur started his career with Tirol Innsbruck and played 12 seasons for them, winning four league titles and a domestic cup. In 1997, he went for a short break to Japan and also played a season in the German Bundesliga for Hamburger SV. At 34 years of age, he signed for SV Pasching and after another four seasons there he decided to make another move and switched to LASK Linz.

International career
Baur made his debut for the Austria national team in a May 1990 friendly match against the Netherlands as a substitute for Kurt Russ and was a non-playing squad member at the 1990 FIFA World Cup. His last international match was an October 2002 European Championship qualifying match, also against the Netherlands. He earned a total of 40 caps, scoring five goals.

Coaching career
Baur was announced as the new head coach of SV Grödig on 7 May 2014, four days before the final match of the end of the 2013–14 season. He begins in the 2014–15 season. He had been the head coach of the reserve team of Red Bull Salzburg from the summer of 2012 to end of November 2013. He was sacked on 4 June 2015.

Career statistics

Club

International

Coaching record

Honours
Tirol Innsbruck
 Austrian Bundesliga: 1989–90, 1999–2000, 2000–01, 2001–02
 Austrian Cup: 1992–93

References

External links
 
 

1969 births
Living people
Sportspeople from Innsbruck
Footballers from Tyrol (state)
Austrian footballers
Association football midfielders
Austria international footballers
1990 FIFA World Cup players
Austrian Football Bundesliga players
J1 League players
Bundesliga players
FC Tirol Innsbruck players
Urawa Red Diamonds players
Hamburger SV players
LASK players
Austrian expatriate footballers
Austrian expatriate sportspeople in Japan
Expatriate footballers in Japan
Austrian expatriate sportspeople in Germany
Expatriate footballers in Germany
FC Wacker Innsbruck players
FC Swarovski Tirol players